A list of films produced in the United Kingdom in 1987 (see 1987 in film):

1987

See also
1987 in British music
1987 in British radio
1987 in British television
1987 in the United Kingdom

References

External links

1987
Films
Lists of 1987 films by country or language